Jaak Boon (born 1948 in Brussels) is a Belgian television writer, director and producer who specializes in the production of comedy.

Mainly a writer for Belgian television, Boon has written for a number of popular mainstream comedies in Belgium such as De Kotmadam since 1991 working with director Ronnie Commissaris. Boon co-wrote the series with Frans Ceusters.

External links
 

Flemish television writers
Male television writers
Mass media people from Brussels
1948 births
Living people
Belgian male writers